Paint Township is one of the fourteen townships of Madison County, Ohio, United States.  The 2000 census found 565 people in the township.

Geography
Located in the southwestern part of the county, it borders the following townships:
Union Township - northeast
Oak Run Township - east
Range Township - southeast
Stokes Township - southwest
Madison Township, Clark County - west
Harmony Township, Clark County - northwest

No municipalities are located in Paint Township.

Name and history
Paint Township takes its name from Paint Creek. It is one of six Paint Townships statewide.

Government
The township is governed by a three-member board of trustees, who are elected in November of odd-numbered years to a four-year term beginning on the following January 1. Two are elected in the year after the presidential election and one is elected in the year before it. There is also an elected township fiscal officer, who serves a four-year term beginning on April 1 of the year after the election, which is held in November of the year before the presidential election. Vacancies in the fiscal officership or on the board of trustees are filled by the remaining trustees.

References

External links

Townships in Madison County, Ohio
Townships in Ohio